Koror City is the largest city and the commercial center in Palau, home to about half of the country's population, located on Oreor Island. During the interwar period it served as the capital of the South Seas Mandate, a group of islands that made up the League of Nations mandated territory held by the Empire of Japan. It was subsequently the capital of Palau until it was replaced by Ngerulmud in 2006.

History 
Koror was the administrative center of the Japanese South Sea Mandate, and thousands of Japanese lived in the city. 
Parts of the city were destroyed by American aerial bombardment during World War II, and after the United States occupied the city they burnt or tore down the remainder of the city, leaving only a few buildings for the occupation forces.

Geography 
In 1993, Koror was home to more than 7,000 people, but in the recent past the number was at times even greater as large numbers of people from other areas would stay in Koror to conduct business. The town is composed of ten hamlets where traditional roots are strong. Koror sprawls across the western end of Oreor Island along a low ridge. This is the volcanic island half of Oreor; the rock island half is, like most of the rock islands, uninhabited. Koror is a part of the Koror Metropolitan Area.

Climate 
Koror has a tropical rainforest climate (Köppen Af) with hot, humid weather conditions throughout the year.

Economy 
Koror is the main tourist destination in Palau and has many resorts, nightclubs, restaurants, and hotels. The government is also a large employer in the city. Tuna export and copra production are two other economic activities of the city.

Places of interest 

 Belau National Museum
 Etpison Museum
 Palau High School
 Palau National Stadium
 Palau Public Library

Twin towns and sister cities 
Koror City is twinned with:
 Angeles City, Philippines
 Davao City, Philippines
 Gilroy, United States
 Manado, Indonesia

References 

Palau
Populated places in Palau
1866 establishments in Oceania
Populated places established in 1866